Ao Vivo may refer to:

Music 
These mostly refer to Brazilian or Portuguese live albums, given that "ao vivo" translates to "live", in Portuguese:

 Ao Vivo, a 1987 album by Brazilian singer-songwriter Beto Guedes
 Ao Vivo, a 1983 album by Brazilian singer-songwriter Milton Nascimento
 Ao Vivo, a 1988 album by Portuguese rock band Xutos & Pontapés
Ao Vivo, a 1988 album by Portuguese musician Rui Veloso
 Ao Vivo, a 1989 album by Brazilian singer-songwriter Joyce
 Ao Vivo, a 1989 album by Brazilian singer Ney Matogrosso
 Ao Vivo, a 1990 album by Brazilian forró singer-songwriter Elba Ramalho
 Ao Vivo, a 1990 album by Brazilian Christian metal band Oficina G3
 Ao Vivo, a 1991 album by Brazilian soft rock band Roupa Nova
 Ao Vivo, a 1992 album by Brazilian sertanejo duo Chitãozinho & Xororó
 Ao Vivo, a 1996 album by Brazilian rock band Capital Inicial
 Ao Vivo, a 1996 album by Brazilian singer 
 Ao Vivo, a 1997 album by Brazilian sertanejo duo 
 Ao Vivo, a 1999 album by Brazilian singer-songwriter Zeca Pagodinho
 Ao Vivo, a 2000 album by Brazilian sertanejo duo Zezé Di Camargo & Luciano
 Banda Calypso Ao Vivo, a 2001 album by Brazilian brega pop band Calypso
 Ao Vivo, a 2001 album by Brazilian sertanejo singer Daniel
 Ao Vivo, a 2001 album by Brazilian singer-songwriter Erasmo Carlos
 Ao Vivo, a 2001 album by Brazilian hip hop group Racionais MC's
 Ao Vivo, 2001 and 2002 live albums by Brazilian sertanejo duo Zezé Di Camargo & Luciano
 Ao Vivo, a 2002 album by Brazilian pagode groupo Exaltasamba
 Ao Vivo, a 2002 album by Brazilian contemporary Christian music singer 
 Ao Vivo, a 2003 album by Brazilian rap group 
 Ao Vivo, a 2003 album by Brazilian gospel music singer-songwriter 
 Ao Vivo, a 2003 album by Brazilian rock band 
 Kelly Key – Ao Vivo, a 2004 album by Portuguese-Brazilian pop singer-songwriter Kelly Key
 Ao Vivo, a 2005 album by Brazilian rock band Biquíni Cavadão
 Ao Vivo, a 2005 album by Brazilian sertanejo duo 
 Ao Vivo, a 2006 album by Brazilian Christian hip hop group 
 Ao Vivo, a 2006 album by Brazilian popular music singer Gal Costa
 Ao Vivo, a 2007 album by Brazilian sertanejo singer-songwriter 
 Ao Vivo, a 2007 album by Brazilian sertanejo duo 
 Ao Vivo, a 2008 album by Brazilian contemporary Christian music singer-songwriter 
 Ao Vivo, a 2008 album by sertanejo duo Marcos & Belutti
 Ao Vivo, a 2009 album by Brazilian singer-songwriter Luan Santana
 Ao Vivo, a 2010 album by Brazilian sertanejo singer-songwriter Michel Teló
 Ao Vivo, a 2010 album by Brazilian reggae-rock band O Rappa
 Ao Vivo, a 2011 album by Brazilian singer 
 Ao Vivo, a 2011 album by Brazilian contemporary Christian music singer 
 Ao Vivo, a 2014 album by Brazilian singer-songwriter Céu
 Ao Vivo, a 2016 album by Brazilian singer Flordelis
 Ao Vivo, a 2017 album by Brazilian contemporary Christian music singer